Capitol Park may refer to:

Places in the United States:
Capitol Park (Sacramento, California)
Capitol Park (Augusta, Maine)
Capitol Park (Tuscaloosa, Alabama) on Childress Hill where the state capitol was located
Capitol Park Historic District, Detroit, Michigan, listed in the National Register of Historic Places
Two defunct 19th-century baseball fields in Washington, D.C.:
Capitol Grounds or Capitol Park I, home of the Washington Nationals, 1884
Swampoodle Grounds or Capitol Park II, home of the Washington Nationals 1886–1889

Places in Croatia:
Capitol Park (Makarska)

See also
 Capital Park (disambiguation)